Frances Gies (June 10, 1915 – December 18, 2013) and Joseph Gies (October 8, 1916 – April 13, 2006) were historians and writers who collaborated on a number of books about the Middle Ages, and also wrote individual works.  They were husband and wife. Joseph Gies graduated from the University of Michigan in 1939.

Select bibliography

Collaborations
 (1969) Life in a Medieval City, 
 (1972) Merchants and Moneymen: The Commercial Revolution, 1000-1500 
 (1974) Life in a Medieval Castle Crowell,  
 (1979) Life in a Medieval Castle 
 (1983) Leonard Of Pisa And The New Mathematics Of The Middle Ages 
 (1987) Marriage and the Family in the Middle Ages 
 (1990) Life in a Medieval Village
 (1994) Cathedral, Forge, and Waterwheel : Technology and Invention in the Middle Ages HarperCollins 
 (1999) A Medieval Family: The Pastons of Fifteenth-Century England New York: HarperCollins
 (2005) Daily Life in Medieval Times, UK: Grange Books, 2005   (Combining Medieval City, Medieval Castle, Medieval Village)

Frances Gies
 (1978) Women in the Middle Ages HarperCollins 
 (1981) Joan of Arc: The Legend and the Reality HarperCollins 
 (1984) The Knight in History HarperCollins

References

Married couples
American medievalists
University of Michigan alumni
Year of birth missing (living people)